Big Boss Man (1963–2004) was a professional wrestler.

Big Boss Man may also refer to:

Big Boss Man (band), a British jazz/funk band
"Big Boss Man" (song), a blues song made famous by Jimmy Reed
Big Boss Man (Jimmy Reed album), 1968
Big Boss Man (The Kentucky Headhunters album), 2005

See also
 Bossman (disambiguation)
 Big Boss (disambiguation)